Earl Jefferson Hamilton (1899 – 7 May 1989) was an American historian, one of the founders of economic history, and a prominent hispanist.

Biography
Hamilton was born in Houlka, Mississippi.

He was married to Gladys Dallas Hamilton, and had one daughter, Sita Hamilton.  Earl and Gladys did extensive research on the economic history of Spain.

He was professor of Duke University from 1927 to 1944; Northwestern University from 1944 to 1947, and University of Chicago from 1947 to 1967. The State University of New York appointed him Distinguished Professor of Economic History (1966–1969). Editor of Journal of Political Economy for seven years. President of Economic History Association (1951–1952).

His major contribution was the history of prices in Spain: the concept of Price Revolution in the 16th century. The work of  Hamilton was coincident intellectually with keynesianism and contemporary crisis of 1929. He started his work on this topic within the International scientific committee on price history, within which he was responsible for Spain.

He died on 7 May 1989.

Works
 American Treasure and the Price Revolution in Spain, 1501-1650 Harvard Economic Studies, 43. Cambridge, Massachusetts: Harvard University Press, 1934.
 Money, prices and wages in Valencia, Aragon and Navarre, 1351-1500 Cambridge, Massachusetts, 1936
 War and Prices in Spain, 1651-1800 Cambridge, Massachusetts Harvard University Press, 1947

See also
 A Program for Monetary Reform (1939)

References

External links
 Earl J. Hamilton Papers on the Economic History of Spain 1351-1830 Duke University.
 Hamilton Collection in the History of Economics University of Chicago.
 Biography of Earl J. Hamilton Asociación Española de Historia Económica.

20th-century American historians
American male non-fiction writers
American Hispanists
1989 deaths
1899 births
Economic historians
People from Chickasaw County, Mississippi
20th-century American male writers
Journal of Political Economy editors